is a Japanese actress and former pop singer. She is a former member of the pop group Morning Musume. Prior to joining Morning Musume, Kudō was a Hello! Pro Egg member. Kudō is the youngest member in history to join Morning Musume, at 11 years and 11 months old, surpassing Ai Kago's 12-year record. She is also known for playing the role of Umika Hayami/Lupin Yellow in the tokusatsu series Kaitou Sentai Lupinranger VS Keisatsu Sentai Patranger.

Biography

Early life
Kudō was born on October 27, 1999, in Saitama Prefecture, Japan.

2010–2011: Debut in Morning Musume
On March 27, 2010, at the 2010 Hello! Project Shinjin Kōen sangatsu: Yokohama Gold! concert, Kudō was introduced as a new member of Hello! Pro Egg. She debuted in concert on May 1, 2010, at the Hello! Project presents: Hello Fest in Odaiba Gurume Park festival.

On September 29, 2011, at a concert at Nippon Budokan, which was part of Morning Musume Concert Tour 2011 Aki Ai Believe: Takahashi Ai Sotsugyō Kinen Special, it was announced that Kudō had passed the auditions alongside three other girls: Haruna Iikubo, Ayumi Ishida and Masaki Satō, and would be joining Morning Musume.

2017–present: Departure from Morning Musume and acting debut
On April 29, 2017, Kudō announced her upcoming departure from Morning Musume and Hello! Project. On December 11, at the Morning Musume Autumn concert tour Kudō graduated from the group. In February 2018, Kudō made her acting debut in Kaitou Sentai Lupinranger VS Keisatsu Sentai Patranger as Lupin Yellow.

Discography
For Haruka Kudō's releases with Morning Musume, see Morning Musume discography.

Singles

Bibliography

Books
Haruka (April 27, 2019, Wani Books)

Photobooks
Do (October 27, 2012, Wani Books)
Ashita Tenki ni Naare! (あした天気になーれ！) (September 27, 2014, Wani Books)
Harukaze (ハルカゼ) (February 27, 2016, Wani Books)
Kudo Haruka (October 27, 2017, Wani Books)
Haru Camera (ハルカメラ) (April 11, 2018, Wani Books)
Lively (March 27, 2020, Wani Books)

Filmography

DVDs and Blu-rays

Television
 (NTV, 2012)
 (NHK, 2015)
 (TV Asahi, 2018–2019)
Toshishita Kareshi（年下彼氏）(ABC Television, 2020.6.7)
Iryusosa (遺留捜査)(TV Asahi, 2021.2.4)

Movies
 Kaitou Sentai Lupinranger VS Keisatsu Sentai Patranger en Film (2018)
 Lupinranger VS Patranger VS Kyuranger (2019)
 Kishiryu Sentai Ryusoulger VS Lupinranger VS Patranger the Movie (2020)
 Kotera-san Climbs! (2020)
 461 Days of Bento: A Promise Between Father and Son (2020)
 Angry Rice Wives (2021)
 Suicide Forest Village (2021)
 Two Outs Bases Loaded (2022), Saki
 Nigekireta Yume (2023), Yuma Suenaga
 Insomniacs After School (2023), Haya Magari

Theater
 (2010)
 (2011)
 (2011)
 (2012)
 (2013)
 (2014)
 (2015)
 (2016)
 (2017)
 (2017)
 (2019)
 (2019–2020)

Awards

Notes

References

External links
 

Japanese women pop singers
21st-century Japanese actresses
Living people
Morning Musume members
Japanese female idols
1999 births
Musicians from Saitama Prefecture